Lee Seol may refer to:

 Lee Seol (actress, born 1993), South Korean actress
 Lee Seol (YouTuber) (born 1992), South Korean online streamer and YouTuber
 Lee Seol (actress, born 1989), South Korean actress